"It's Only Love" is a 1965 song by The Beatles, covered by Gary U.S. Bonds and others

It's Only Love may also refer to:

Film and television
 It's Only Love (film), a 1947 Austrian film directed by Emmerich Hanus
 "It's Only Love", an episode of Working Girl

Music

Albums
 It's Only Love (Rita Coolidge album) or the title song, 1975
 It's Only Love (Simply Red album) or the title song, a cover of the Barry White song (see below), 2000
 It's Only Love, or the title song (see below), by Tommy James and the Shondells, 1966

Songs
 "It's Only Love" (B. J. Thomas song), 1969
 "It's Only Love" (Bryan Adams song), 1985
 "It's Only Love" (Cheap Trick song), 1986
 "It's Only Love" (Donna Summer song), 2008
 "It's Only Love" (Jeannie Seely song), 1966
 "It's Only Love" (Matt Cardle song), 2012
 "It's Only Love" (Tommy James and the Shondells song), 1966
 "It's Only Love" (ZZ Top song), 1976
 "It's Only Love"/"Sorry Baby", by Masaharu Fukuyama, 1994
 "It's Only Love Doing Its Thing", by Barry White, 1978; covered by Simply Red as "It's Only Love"
 "It's Only Love", by Def Leppard from Euphoria, 1999
 "It's Only Love", by Ejecta from Dominae, 2013
 "It's Only Love", by Joe Cocker from Respect Yourself, 2002
 "It's Only Love", by Sheryl Crow from C'mon, C'mon, 2002
 "It's Only Love", by Stevie Nicks from Trouble in Shangri-La, 2001

See also
 Only Love (disambiguation)